Mathis Servais (born 23 November 2004) is a Belgian professional footballer who plays as a forward for Belgian First Division B side Club NXT.

Carrière en club
Mathis Servais a débuté dans un petit club de sa région l'E.S. Molignée (Mettent,Namur,Belgique).

Il rejoint le Sporting Charleroi. 

À 14 ans il rejoint le Club Brugge KV.

Actuellement il joue pour l'équipe réserve du Club Brugge KV (Club NXT) D1b

Club

References

External links
Profile at the Club Brugge website

2004 births
Living people
Belgian footballers
Association football forwards
Club Brugge KV players
Challenger Pro League players
Belgium youth international footballers